Osmium dioxide is an inorganic compound with the formula OsO2. It exists as brown to black crystalline powder, but single crystals are golden and exhibit metallic conductivity.  The compound crystallizes in the rutile structural motif, i.e. the connectivity is very similar to that in the mineral rutile.

Preparation
OsO2 can be obtained by the reaction of osmium with a variety of oxidizing agents, including, sodium chlorate, osmium tetroxide, and nitric oxide at about 600 °C. Using chemical transport, one can obtain large crystals of OsO2, sized up to 7x5x3 mm3. Single crystals show metallic resistivity of ~15 μΩ cm. A typical transport agent is  via the reversible formation of volatile OsO4:
 OsO2  +  O2  OsO4

Reactions
OsO2 does not dissolve in water, but is attacked by dilute hydrochloric acid. The crystals have rutile structure. Unlike osmium tetroxide, OsO2 is not toxic.

References

Osmium compounds
Transition metal oxides